Matteo G. Martemucci is a United States Air Force brigadier general currently serving as the director for intelligence of the United States Cyber Command. Prior to that, he was the director for intelligence of the Combined Joint Task Force – Operation Inherent Resolve.

References 

Living people
Year of birth missing (living people)
Place of birth missing (living people)
United States Air Force generals
Brigadier generals